Agyapong or Agyepong is a Ghanaian surname that may refer to

 Akosua Agyapong (born 1969),  Ghanaian highlife artiste and television personality
 Finette Agyapong (born 1997), English sprinter
 Flings Owusu-Agyapong (born 1988), Ghanaian sprinter
 Francis Agyepong (born 1965), English triple jumper
Jacqui Agyepong, (born 1969), English hurdler, sister of Francis
 Kennedy Agyapong, Ghanaian politician and businessman 
 Kwabena Agyapong (born 1962), Ghanaian civil engineer, politician and sports journalist
Thomas Agyepong  (born 1996), Ghanaian football winger

Ghanaian surnames